Too Cute is an American television series that aired on Animal Planet from April 30, 2011 to January 2, 2017. Once a series of four separate specials in 2011, Too Cute became a series a year later with seven episodes in its second season. Reruns of this show air on both Discovery Family and Animal Planet.

Synopsis
Each episode tells a "coming of age" story as narrated by theater veteran Henry Strozier (who, for this show, was twice nominated for an Primetime Emmy Award for Outstanding Narrator), and features three different groups of animals, mostly cats and dogs, in the first eight to 12 weeks of their lives. The events of this time period of an animal's life are observed and presented from the first tentative steps that help them get started investigating the new world around them, to the days of playful contact with new creatures and familiar faces. At the end of each episode, an epilogue is shown of the pets that stand out from each litter or animal group. Before the show cuts to a commercial break (the viewer is presented with a preview of coming events as well as a "Too Cute Quiz," a question concerning animal breeds. Once the show returns from the break, the correct answer is given along with an explanation or comment about it. The beginning of the show also gently spoofs at the "viewer discretion advised" warning:
 
"The following program contains material that is just too cute. Viewer discretion is advised."

It was announced that Too Cute returned for a third season with new episodes that aired on August 3, 2013. Also, Animal Planet partnered up with the Washington Animal Rescue League to launch the "Too Cute Kitten Cam" for online viewing.

Episodes

See also
Pick of the Litter - 2018 documentary film similar in content
Puppy Bowl
Coming of age story

References

External links

2011 American television series debuts
2017 American television series endings
Animal Planet original programming
2010s American documentary television series
Television series about cats
Television shows about dogs